The Crested Butte Wild Flower Festival is a week-long event that takes place annually in July in Crested Butte, Colorado, USA. Established in 1986, the flower-focused festival includes hikes, tours, workshops and performances, and raises awareness of environmental issues, including the importance of preserving wild flowers in the city. Thousands of artists, vendors and people from all over the world gather in the town of Crested Butte for a weekend of art, food, dancing and music.

There was no festival in 2020.

References

External links

Tourist attractions in Gunnison County, Colorado
Festivals in Colorado
July events
Flower festivals in the United States